El Adelanto is a small town and municipality in the Jutiapa department of Guatemala.

Geography 
El Adelanto is located in southeastern Guatemala, 150 km away from Guatemala City and 32 km southeast of Jutiapa, the seat of the department of Jutiapa. 

It borders the municipality of Jutiapa to the north, Yupiltepeque to the east, Zapotitlán to the south, and Comapa to the southwest. The municipal seat is also known as El Adelanto.

Demographics 
According to the 2001 Census, the municipality had 6398 inhabitants. However, the website of the municipality also makes reference to a total population of 5313 inhabitants.

References

External links 
 El Adelanto Municipal Website (Spanish)
 El Adelanto - Asociación Nacional de Municipalidades de la República de Guatemala Official information about the municipal government (Spanish)

All the information in this page was retrieved from the following websites on September 12, 2009: 
 http://www.inforpressca.com/eladelanto/index.php 
and 
 https://web.archive.org/web/20110721084608/http://www.anam.org.gt/LAIP/eladelanto/index.php.

Municipalities of the Jutiapa Department